"" (also called ""; , IPA: , "National Salute") is the national anthem of the Maldives. The lyrics were written by Muhammad Jameel Didi in 1948, and the melody was composed by Sri Lankan maestro Pandit Amaradeva in 1972.

"Qaumee Salaam" is a declaration of national unity, the country's Islamic faith, the victory of historic battles and an homage to the heroes who fell defending the nation. It also wishes further development on the country, while paying respect to the leaders who had served it.

History
Soon after, it was decided that the  needed lyrics accompanied by a new melody. The lyrics were written by a young poet and later chief justice, Mohamed Jameel Didi.

Jameel Didi wrote the words for the new  bearing in mind the influence of Urdu poetry during the time, closely imitating its style and also furnishing his work with words borrowed from Arabic. Afterwards, Jameel Didi began looking for a tune to accompany his poem when he heard the noon chime ("Auld Lang Syne") of his uncle's clock. The tune was adopted to the lyrics, and the new  was complete.

Throughout the 1950s and 1960s, Maldivians became more aware of the importance of a national anthem, and in 1972, shortly before the Maldives was visited by Queen Elizabeth II of the United Kingdom, the government hastily commissioned Sri Lankan maestro W. D. Amaradeva for a new melody for the anthem. The original lyrics were retained, with a few changes to emphasise the fact that Maldives had been a republic since 1968. , this version of the anthem has survived without any modifications.

Lyrics
Normally, only the chorus and first two verses are sung.

Notes

References

External links
 The Maldives Royal Family website has a page on the anthem, including a midi file version. (archive link)
 Streaming audio of the national anthem of the Maldives, with information and lyrics (archive link)

Maldivian music
National symbols of the Maldives
National anthem compositions in D-flat major